Zhang Shude (1922–1988) was a People's Republic of China politician. He was born in Lingshi County, Shanxi Province. He was the 4th Chairman of the People's Standing Congress of Henan. He was a delegate to the 4th National People's Congress, 6th National People's Congress and 7th National People's Congress.

References
哈尔滨市地方志编纂委员会. 《哈尔滨市志: 报业, 广播电视》. 黑龙江人民出版社. 1994年: 235页.
张树德（1922—1988）. 刘巧云. [2012-04-06].

1922 births
1988 deaths
People's Republic of China politicians from Shanxi
Chinese Communist Party politicians from Shanxi
Political office-holders in Henan
Delegates to the 4th National People's Congress
Delegates to the 6th National People's Congress
Delegates to the 7th National People's Congress
Politicians from Jinzhong